Slime Rancher is a first-person life simulation adventure video game developed and published by American indie studio Monomi Park. The game was released as an early access title in January 2016, with an official release on Windows, macOS, Linux and Xbox One on August 1, 2017. A PlayStation 4 version was released on August 21, 2018, and a Nintendo Switch version was released on August 11, 2021. A DLC named 'Slime Rancher: Secret Style Pack' was released on June 18, 2019 which added additional cosmetic appearances. A sequel, Slime Rancher 2, was released in early access on September 22, 2022, for Windows and Xbox Series X/S.

Gameplay 

The game is played in an open world and from a first-person perspective. The player controls a character named Beatrix LeBeau, a rancher who moves to a planet far from Earth called the Far Far Range to live the life of a "slime rancher", which consists of constructing her ranch and exploring the world of the Far Far Range in order to collect, raise, feed, and breed slimes. Slimes are gelatinous living organisms of various sizes and characteristics. To progress she has notes left by the former owner of the ranch that help her on her journey through the Far Far Range.

The game's main economic aspect revolves around feeding slimes the appropriate food items so that they produce "plorts", which can then be sold in exchange for Newbucks, which are used to purchase upgrades to the rancher's equipment or farm buildings. Except for the basic pink slime, slimes will only eat one of the three types of food; fruit, veggie, and meat. Slimes have a favourite food, if they eat this food they will produce double the normal number of plorts. The player moves the character around a variety of environments and can collect slimes, food items, and plorts by sucking them up with their vacuum tool (called a "Vacpack", a portmanteau of vacuum and backpack). They can only store a limited number of items and item types at a time and must go back to their ranch to unload their collected items before being able to collect more. The player must buy and upgrade various enclosures to house their collected slimes and farms for storing their food. Upgrades can also be aesthetic upgrades to the character's home, Vacpack, and the ranch itself.

Different types of slimes can be combined and enlarged by feeding a slime a plort from another species, making them noticeably larger and able to produce two plorts (known as "Largo" in game). However, if a slime combines more than three traits by eating a third plort different from either species of slime it is combined with, it becomes an aggressive malevolent black slime called the "Tarr",  which devours all other slimes around it as well as being able to damage the player. The player can pump fresh water from ponds and springs to splash and disintegrate the Tarrs.

There are different kinds of slimes in the game, which all differ from small traits like simple ears, wings, and tails, to the ability to teleport or grab a chicken via a vine that emerges from the ground. Some of the types of slimes available in game include, docile (not feral), harmful, non-farmable, and feral. Most slimes also have a Gordo version of themselves. These Gordos are extremely large and cannot move around like regular or Largo slimes. These are found across the Far Far Range. Players can shoot food items at them until they explode, to gain normal versions of the Gordo slime's species. When exploded they also produce crates containing random loot as well as either a teleporter or "slime key" which allow access to new areas or fast-travel between known areas.

Development 
Development of Slime Rancher started in Popovich's apartment. As Popovich was an artist and designer rather than a programmer, he relied on other people's code to create a prototype of the game. He eventually enlisted technical director Mike Thomas to help with the programming. They worked on the game for eight hours a day, a practice Popovich used with employees of Monomi Park to avoid crunch.

The game was initially due to enter early access after a year, but was delayed by six months.

Reception 

The Early Access version of the Slime Rancher received generally positive reviews. Heather Alexandra from Kotaku noticed some bugs, but gave the game a positive review, saying that "I'm not usually a fan of games with catharsis but when I return to my bright and goofy farm at the end of the day? I can't help but smile as wide as my slimy little friends." Steve Neilsen from Games Mojo awarded it 4.5 out of 5 stars, stating that "Slime Rancher is fun and addictive game, with a fun premise and cute creatures. The cartoon style graphics look amazing, and gameplay is clever and full of cute."

The full release of the game got a score of 81/100 on Metacritic, with reviewers saying it had the ability to keep you hooked for hours. Reviewers also said it was relaxing and cathartic, but quite repetitive, and successfully taps into the addictive nature of farming simulators.

By May 2017, the game had sold over 800,000 copies. By February 28, 2019, the game had sold 2 million copies. By January 13, 2022, the game had sold over 5 million copies.

In Game Informers Reader's Choice Best of 2017 Awards, the game tied in third place along with Forza Motorsport 7 for "Best Microsoft Game", while it came in second place for "Best Simulation Game". The website also gave it the award for the latter category in their Best of 2017 Awards.

Accolades

References

External links

2017 video games
Early access video games
Biological simulation video games
Linux games
MacOS games
Open-world video games
PlayStation 4 games
Single-player video games
Video games about evolution
Video games developed in the United States
Video games featuring female protagonists
Video games set on fictional planets
Windows games
Xbox Cloud Gaming games
Xbox One games
Xbox Play Anywhere games
Nintendo Switch games
First-person adventure games
Science fiction video games
Farming video games
Indie video games